The Little East Conference men's basketball tournament is the annual conference basketball championship tournament for the NCAA Division III Little East Conference. The tournament has been held annually since 1987. It is a single-elimination tournament and seeding is based on regular conference season records.

The winner, declared conference champion, receives the Little East's automatic bid to the NCAA Men's Division III Basketball Championship.

Results

Championship records

Castleton has not yet qualified for the tournament finals.

References

NCAA Division III men's basketball conference tournaments
Basketball, Men's, Tournament
Recurring sporting events established in 1987